The 2000 Clemson Tigers football team represented Clemson University during the 2000 NCAA Division I-A football season.

Schedule

Roster

Rankings

References

Clemson
Clemson Tigers football seasons
Clemson Tigers football